Logan County is a county located in the west central portion of the U.S. state of Ohio. As of the 2020 census, the population was 46,150. The county seat is Bellefontaine.  The county is named for Benjamin Logan, who fought Native Americans in the area.

Logan County comprises the Bellefontaine, OH Micropolitan Statistical Area, which is also included in the Columbus-Marion-Zanesville, OH Combined Statistical Area.

Geography

Adjacent counties
 Hardin County (north)
 Union County (east)
 Champaign County (south)
 Shelby County (west)
 Auglaize County (northwest)

Major highways
  U.S. Route 33
  U.S. Route 68
  State Route 47
  State Route 117
  State Route 235
  State Route 245
  State Route 273
  State Route 274
  State Route 287
  State Route 292
  State Route 347
  State Route 365
  State Route 366
  State Route 368
  State Route 508
  State Route 533
  State Route 540
  State Route 559
  State Route 706
  State Route 708
  State Route 720

Demographics

2000 census
As of the census of 2000, there were 46,005 people, 17,956 households, and 12,730 families living in the county. The population density was 100 people per square mile (39/km2). There were 21,571 housing units at an average density of 47 per square mile (18/km2). The racial makeup of the county was 96.15% White, 1.71% Black or African American, 0.20% Native American, 0.40% Asian, 0.03% Pacific Islander, 0.27% from other races, and 1.24% from two or more races. 0.72% of the population were Hispanic or Latino of any race. 96.8% spoke English, 1.0% German and 1.0% Spanish as their first language.

There were 17,956 households, out of which 33.30% had children under the age of 18 living with them, 57.00% were married couples living together, 9.50% had a female householder with no husband present, and 29.10% were non-families. 24.80% of all households were made up of individuals, and 10.30% had someone living alone who was 65 years of age or older. The average household size was 2.53 and the average family size was 3.01.

In the county, the population was spread out, with 26.70% under the age of 18, 8.20% from 18 to 24, 27.90% from 25 to 44, 23.30% from 45 to 64, and 13.90% who were 65 years of age or older. The median age was 37 years. For every 100 females there were 96.10 males. For every 100 females age 18 and over, there were 93.60 males.

The median income for a household in the county was $41,479, and the median income for a family was $47,516. Males had a median income of $37,134 versus $24,739 for females. The per capita income for the county was $18,984. About 7.10% of families and 9.30% of the population were below the poverty line, including 11.80% of those under age 18 and 8.50% of those age 65 or over.

2010 census
As of the 2010 United States Census, there were 45,858 people, 18,111 households, and 12,569 families living in the county. The racial makeup of the county was 95.3% white, 1.6% black or African American, 0.5% Asian, 0.3% American Indian, 0.3% from other races, and 1.9% from two or more races. Those of Hispanic or Latino origin made up 1.2% of the population. In terms of ancestry, 30.9% were German, 13.5% were Irish, 11.5% were American, and 9.1% were English.

Of the 18,111 households, 32.9% had children under the age of 18 living with them, 53.9% were married couples living together, 10.5% had a female householder with no husband present, 30.6% were non-families, and 25.5% of all households were made up of individuals. The average household size was 2.51 and the average family size was 2.98. The median age was 39.9 years.

The median income for a household in the county was $46,493 and the median income for a family was $53,601. Males had a median income of $42,702 versus $29,537 for females. The per capita income for the county was $22,974. About 11.0% of families and 14.8% of the population were below the poverty line, including 25.3% of those under age 18 and 7.1% of those age 65 or over.

Politics
Logan County is a strongly Republican county, having only backed Democratic Party presidential candidates twice from 1856 onward in 1912 and 1964.

|}

Government
Commissioners:
Paul Benedetti (R),
Joe Antram (R),
Mark Robinson (R)

Auditor:
Jack Reser (R)

Clerk of Courts:
Barb McDonald (R) 

Recorder:
Pat Myers (R) (Appointed July 2, 2013) 

Treasurer:
Rhonda Stafford (R)

Prosecuting Attorney:
Eric Stewart (R)

Sheriff:
Randall J. Dodds (R)

Engineer:
Scott Coleman (R)

Coroner:
Michael E. Failor D.O. (R)

Judge Court of Common Pleas:
William T. Goslee (R)

Judge Court of Common Pleas Probate/Juvenile Division:
Kim Kellogg-Martin (R)

Judge Court of Common Pleas Domestic Relations-Juv.-Probate Division:
Dan W. Bratka (R)

Judge Municipal Court:
Ann E. Beck (D)

Communities

City
 Bellefontaine (county seat)

Villages

 Belle Center
 De Graff
 Huntsville
 Lakeview
 Quincy
 Ridgeway
 Rushsylvania
 Russells Point
 Valley Hi
 West Liberty
 West Mansfield
 Zanesfield

Townships

 Bloomfield
 Bokes Creek
 Harrison
 Jefferson
 Lake
 Liberty
 McArthur
 Miami
 Monroe
 Perry
 Pleasant
 Richland
 Rushcreek
 Stokes
 Union
 Washington
 Zane

https://web.archive.org/web/20160715023447/http://www.ohiotownships.org/township-websites

Census-designated places
 Chippewa Park
 East Liberty
 Lewistown

Unincorporated communities

 Big Springs
 Bloom Center
 Cherokee
 Flatwoods
 Gretna
 Harper
 Horton
 Logansville
 McKees Town
 Middleburg
 New Jerusalem
 New Richland
 North Greenfield
 Northwood
 Orchard Island
 Pickrelltown
 Santa Fe
 Walnut Grove
 White Town

Notable people

 George Bartholomew - inventor of concrete pavement
 Blue Jacket (Weyapiersenwah) - Shawnee chief
 Bethany Dillon - singer; nominee for 2004 Gospel Music Association New Artist of the Year award
 Allan W. Eckert - author
 Jim Flora - artist
 Melville J. Herskovits - anthropologist
 Kin Hubbard - cartoonist and journalist
 Samuel Johnston - professional wrestler
 Edward D. Jones - investment banker
 Austin Eldon Knowlton - architect
 William Lawrence - Republican politician involved with the attempt to impeach Andrew Johnson, creating the United States Department of Justice, helping to create the American Red Cross, and ratifying the Geneva Convention
 The Mills Brothers - entertainers
 Raymond Stanton Patton (1882–1937), rear admiral and first flag officer of the United States Coast and Geodetic Survey Corps and second Director of the United States Coast and Geodetic Survey (1929-1937)
 Norman Vincent Peale - minister and author

See also
 National Register of Historic Places listings in Logan County, Ohio

References

External links
 County website

 
1818 establishments in Ohio
Populated places established in 1818